Fernet Stock is a herbal bitters made in Plzeň-Božkov, Czech Republic. It is flavoured with approximately 14 herbs, imported from the Mediterranean and the Alps. It is also available in a sweeter form as Fernet Stock Citrus. The original Fernet is approximately 40% alcohol (Italian version 41%), whereas the Citrus is a lower 30%.

History
In 1884, the italian Lionello Stock founded during the crisis after the Panic of 1873 the Camis & Stock company in Trieste. Its flagship product was cognac, but following the end of the First World War, trade between the countries from the empire became more difficult. Stock bought a distillery in Božkov (a village near Plzeň) and founded a subsidiary called Stock Cognac Medicinal. At first, spirits transported from Trieste were bottled there. Cognac or brandy were long the firm's flagship products. The plant began gradually operating independently and shipments from Trieste came to an end.

In 1927, the Pilsen company Stock Cognac Medicinal Božkov u Plzně began with its production of a bitter liqueur Fernet Stock. It was however hit by the Great Depression in 1929 and then seized by the Nazis as Jewish property in 1939, and ending up as national property by the end of the Second World War. Although Lionello Stock regained possession briefly in 1947, it was nationalized in 1948. Fernet Stock's popularity only increased through the 1960s and 70s, and following the Velvet Revolution, its sales increased dramatically. In the nineties, sales of the popular liqueurs grew by 500%. In 1997, Stock Plzeň introduced the Fernet Stock Citrus, which over the two years became the second most popular Czech alcoholic spirit, right behind Fernet Stock.

In 1993, the distillery's original owner Stock Trieste became its majority shareholder. In 2007, Stock Plzeň were sold to Tenebro, a company belonging to the U.S. Oaktree Capital Management group.

Variations
 Fernet Stock – original first produced in 1927 in Božkov (now part of Plzeň), 40% ABV.
 Fernet Stock Citrus – launched in 1997, with lemon taste, 30% ABV.
 Fernet Stock S mátou – with mint taste, 30% ABV.
 Fernet Stock Hruška – with pear taste, 30% ABV.
 Fernet Stock Cranberry – with cranberry taste, 27% ABV.

See also

References

External links
Stock Triest
Stock Plzeň-Božkov
Fernet Stock Hungary

Bitters
Czech brands
Italian brands
Czech distilled drinks
Products introduced in 1927